Rheingold is the thirty-eighth album by Klaus Schulze. It was originally released in 2008, and, taking in consideration the previously released multi-disc box sets (Silver Edition, Historic Edition, Jubilee Edition, Contemporary Works I, and Contemporary Works II), it could be viewed as Schulze's ninety-ninth album. This is the second Schulze album with guest vocalist Lisa Gerrard. It was recorded at an open-air concert in Loreley, Germany. There are several different iterations of this album: an edition of two CDs, an edition of two DVDs, and a limited edition of two CDs with two DVDs.

Track listing

Disc 1

Disc 2

External links 
 Rheingold at the official site of Klaus Schulze
 

Klaus Schulze albums
Ambient albums by German artists
2008 live albums
Trance albums
Klaus Schulze live albums